The year 1889 was marked, in science fiction, by the following events.

Births and deaths

Births

Deaths 
 August 19 – Auguste Villiers de l'Isle-Adam, French writer (b. 1838)

Events

Awards 
The main science-fiction Awards known at the present time did not exist at that time.

Literary releases

Novels 
 The Purchase of the North Pole, by Jules Verne.
 A Connecticut Yankee in King Arthur's Court, by Mark Twain.
 Urion by Camille Flammarion

Stories collections

Short stories 
  A Day of an American Journalist in 2889, short story by Jules Verne.

References

Science fiction by year

science-fiction